The following are the presidents of the University of Nevada, Reno from its founding in 1874 to the present day.

List

References

Nevada
University of Nevada, Reno
University of Nevada, Reno-related lists

University of Nevada, Reno